Anne Stokes is a fantasy artist whose early work has appeared in role-playing games, particularly Dungeons & Dragons.

Early life 
Originally from London, Stokes has had an interest in the fantasy genre since her father read The Hobbit to her as a child.

Career
Stokes has been a professional artist since 2000.

She has illustrated for Wizards of the Coast, including Dungeons & Dragons. Her Dungeons & Dragons work includes interior art for the 3.5 edition books Monster Manual III (2004), Player's Handbook II (2006), Monster Manual IV (2006), Fiendish Codex I: Hordes of the Abyss (2006), Complete Mage (2006), Magic Item Compendium (2007), Monster Manual V (2007) and Rules Compendium (2007), and the 4th edition Monster Manual (2008) and Manual of the Planes (2008).

Stokes did the cover artwork for the One Minute Silence album Available in All Colours.

Morten Veland from the  Norwegian gothic metal band Sirenia was surfing the internet when he found Stokes's mermaid picture titled "Siren's Lament". He became interested and contacted her for the permits to use it as an album cover for Perils of the Deep Blue.

Stokes lives in Yorkshire, England.

References

External links
 Anne Stokes's website
 

Living people
21st-century English women artists
Artists from London
British speculative fiction artists
British women illustrators
English illustrators
Fantasy artists
Role-playing game artists
Year of birth missing (living people)